"Mr. Ice Cream Man" is the first single from Master P's album Ice Cream Man. The single reached number 90 on the Billboard Hot 100 and it features Silkk the Shocker. The single was produced by both K-Lou and Master P.

Track listing

Charts

References

1995 songs
American hip hop songs
Master P songs
Silkk the Shocker songs
1996 debut singles
Gangsta rap songs